Albert Floyd Piccirilli (July 13, 1928 – May 24, 2020), also known by his stage name Al Rex, was an American bass player for Bill Haley & His Comets and its predecessor Bill Haley and the Saddlemen.

Background
He started playing for them in 1949 and became noted for "wild antics" on stage. He formed his own band, Al Rex and the Regaleers in 1960. He left the music industry soon after, although he continued to perform on occasion. He later had a wife and fathered eight children. On May 24, 2020, he died in his Norristown, Pennsylvania home from pneumonia. He was the last surviving of the Comets.

Film appearances
He appeared as a member of the band in the 1950s films Rock Around the Clock (1956) and Don't Knock the Rock (1957).

References

External links
 

1928 births
2020 deaths
20th-century American guitarists
American people of Italian descent
Bill Haley & His Comets members
Musicians from New York City